Syfania is a genus of moths of the family Noctuidae. The genus was described by Oberthür in 1893.

Species
 Syfania bieti Oberthür, 1886
 Syfania dejeani Oberthür, 1893
 Syfania dubernardi Oberthür, 1894
 Syfania giraudeaui Oberthür, 1893

References

Agaristinae